Quaboag Pond is a  pond located a couple of miles south of and between East Brookfield and Brookfield, Massachusetts. The pond lies about two miles (3 km) south of state Route 9 as it passes through East Brookfield. Quaboag Pond was once named Podunk Pond.

Description
The average depth is 7 feet (2.13 m) with the maximum depth about 10 feet (3.05 m). The water is brown in color and quite warm in the summertime. Non-native invasive plants cover substantial portions of this pond; the pond lies in a swampy area, also subject to the invasive species.

Local swamps feed Quaboag Pond as well as inflow from the East Brookfield River, a two-mile (3.22 km) long river that heads at the Lake Lashaway Dam, and Quacumquasit Pond to its south. Some documents do not acknowledge the existence of the East Brookfield River and instead refer to this waterway as the Seven Mile River, although it is the Five Mile River that the Lake Lashaway Dam impounds creating Lake Lashaway, which feeds this river, not the Seven Mile. Quaboag Pond is part of the Chicopee River Watershed and it drains into the Quaboag River.

Fishing
Lake Lashaway, which flows into this pond, offers good fishing for many warm water fish. A survey conducted in 1994 showed thirteen species including Large and Small-mouth Bass, Chain Pickerel,  Yellow Perch, White Perch, Black Crappie, Bluegill, Pumpkinseed, Brown and Yellow Bullhead, Golden Shiner, and Sucker. Lake Lashaway was stocked with Northern Pike in the past.

References
Lake Lashaway information
East Brookfield River information
Quaboag Pond technical data
Quaboag Quacumquasit Lake Association (QQLA)
Historic photographs

External links
 MassWildlife map and information

Lakes of Worcester County, Massachusetts
Ponds of Massachusetts